The Las Flores Estancia (also known as Las Flores Asistencia) was established in 1823 as an estancia ("station"). It was part of the Spanish missions, asistencias, and estancias system in Las Californias—Alta California. Las Flores Estancia was situated approximately halfway between Mission San Luis Rey de Francia and Mission San Juan Capistrano. It is located near Bell Canyon on the Camp Pendleton Marine Corps Base ten miles south of the City of San Clemente in northern San Diego County, California.  The estancia is also home to the architecturally significant National Historic Landmark Las Flores Adobe, completed in 1868.

History

The first recorded baptisms in upper Las Californias took place on July 22, 1769, on the banks of a nearby stream, dubbed Los Cristianos by the Spanish soldiers who accompanied the missionaries northward during the Portolà expedition.

Known at one time as the "San Pedro Rancho," the property featured a tile-roofed chapel (visita) and a hostel, both built by relocated Luiseño and Juaneño Native Americans, the latter for the use of traveling clergy. The buildings formed three sides of a square, 142 feet by 153 feet, all roofed with tile. A portion of the south wing had a second story, and the campanile (bell tower) was utilized as a navigational aid by early sailing ships. The chapel was visited by residents of two nearby Native American villages, Chumella and Questmille. Mission San Luis Rey was raising sheep at Las Flores as early as 1810. To sustain the installation barley, maize, and wheat, were grown and cattle were grazed at nearby Las Pulgas ("the fleas"); also notable was the production of hides and tallow.

Although Governor José Figueroa (who took office in 1833) initially attempted to keep the mission system intact, the Mexican Congress nevertheless passed An Act for the Secularization of the Missions of California on August 17, 1833. Thereafter, the Franciscans all but abandoned the mission, taking with them most everything of value, after which the locals salvaged many of the mission buildings for construction materials. In spite of this neglect, the Luiseño Native American town at Las Flores (along with the Juaneño one at San Juan Capistrano and Luiseño one at San Dieguito) continued on for some time under a provision in Gobernador Echeandía's 1826 Proclamation that allowed for the partial conversion of missions to pueblos. The site was also the scene of the April 1838 battle between the forces of Juan Bautista Alvarado and Carlos Antonio Carrillo in which the provincial governorship of Alta California was contested.

The former estancia formed part of an 1841 Mexican land grant for the "Rancho Santa Margarita y Las Flores", granted to the Pico brothers.  They built a large traditional Spanish adobe on the estancia grounds, and operated a sheep ranch into the 1860s, when it failed due to drought.  In 1864 Pio Pico sold the Las Flores ranch to his brother-in-law, Juan Forster, who made it part of a much larger ranch.

The ranch was acquired in 1941 by the United States Government when it established the United States Marine Corps' Camp Pendleton.  The government subsequently leased  around the estancia to the Boy Scouts of America.  In 1974, the Boy Scouts constructed a camp (Rancho Las Flores) on the property which is visited by thousands of scouts and other youth annually.

Las Flores Adobe
The Las Flores Adobe was built in 1867-68 by Marco Forster, the son of Juan Forster.  It is located on the west side of Stuart Mesa Road, near its junction with Las Pulgas Road.  It is a large U-shaped structure, with a main two-story section forming one side of the U, and single-story sections forming its other elements.  The two-story section is a late but high quality example of Monterey Colonial architecture, with a wood frame, plastered adobe walls, and a wooden veranda encircling it.  The building underwent a major restoration beginning 2001, sponsored by the Marine Corps and the Camp Pendleton Historical Society.  The society leads periodic tours of the site.

See also
 List of Spanish missions in California
 San Antonio de Pala Asistencia
 Luiseño
 Mission Indians
 California mission clash of cultures
 Mission San Juan Capistrano
 Mission San Luis Rey de Francia
 List of National Historic Landmarks in California
 National Register of Historic Places in San Diego County, California

Notes

References

External links
Camp Pendleton Historical Society
Description of Site

Spanish missions in California
1823 in Alta California
Adobe buildings and structures in California
Churches in San Diego County, California
California Historical Landmarks
National Register of Historic Places in San Diego County, California
Properties of religious function on the National Register of Historic Places in California
California Mission Indians
Native American history of California
History of San Diego County, California
1823 establishments in Alta California